The Harrogate Band is a brass band based in Harrogate, North Yorkshire, England and was formed in 1970. They perform regularly in the local area and compete nationally in the 1st Section. The band are one of North Yorkshire's premier brass bands and are seen as a progressive and versatile band with strong community links who can provide music for any occasion. The Band have appeared on television many times on programmes such as Heartbeat, Escape to the Country , The One Show. Grayson Perry All Man (2016) Season 1 Episode 1. In 2016, the band was presented with the Sash award.

Recent contest performances
The Harrogate Band are currently the reigning North of England 1st Section Champions, having won the 1st section contest at the Dolphin Centre, Darlington on 17 March 2018. Not only did the band win the 1st prize, but they also took home silverware for the Best Bass Section, Best Euphonium and Best Trombone (Bass Trombone). The band went on to represent the North of England in the National Championships which were held on 16 September 2018 at the Racecourse Centre, Cheltenham.

Notable members (present)
 Leigh Baker - Musical Director
 Amy Hiles - Principal Cornet
 Catherine Morland - Solo Euphonium
 Lizzie Brookes - Soprano Cornet
 Sam Watson - Flugelhorn
 Chris - Solo Horn
 Dan Dickinson - Solo Trombone
 Keri Graham - Baritone
 Gavin Holman - E-flat Tuba
 Vince Ashby-Smith - Percussion

Partial discography

References

Video clips
 The Band performing at Durham Miners Gala in 2010
 The Band performing at Durham Miners Gala in 2011

External links 
 
 Harrogate Band
 Harrogate Band - the premier brass band in the locality | Hello Yorkshire Blog
 Instagram Account
 ibew.co.uk

Organisations based in Harrogate
Musical groups established in 1970
British instrumental musical groups
British brass bands
Musical groups from Harrogate